Gordon Morgan may refer to:

Gordon Morgan (Australian cricketer) (1893–1967), Australian cricketer
Gordon Daniel Morgan (1931–2019), American sociologist
Gordon Morgan (English cricketer) (born 1959), English cricketer
Gordon Morgan, leader of West Midlands County Council, 1981–1986

See also
Sir Gordon Morgan Holmes (1876–1965), British neurologist